Elections for Borders Regional Council took place on Thursday 6 May 1982, alongside elections to the various regional councils across Scotland.

Independents won 12 of the council's 23 seats.

Aggregate results

References

Borders Regional Council election
1982
Borders Regional Council election